Birgitte Sættem (born July 9, 1978 in Molde) is a Norwegian team handball player and Olympic medalist. She received a bronze medal at the 2000 Summer Olympics in Sydney with the Norwegian national team.

References

External links

1978 births
Living people
Norwegian female handball players
Olympic bronze medalists for Norway
Olympic handball players of Norway
Handball players at the 2000 Summer Olympics
Sportspeople from Møre og Romsdal
Olympic medalists in handball
Medalists at the 2000 Summer Olympics